Grevillea sparsiflora, commonly known as sparse flowered grevillea, is a species of flowering plant in the family Proteaceae and is endemic to the south of Western Australia. It is a low, spreading shrub with  crowded, linear leaves and pinkish-red flowers arranged singly or in groups of up to five.

Description
The leaves are covered with whitish, somewhat silky hairs when young and the edges are rolled under, enclosing the lower surface, apart from the midvein.

This grevillea is similar to Grevillea decipiens which has 7–9 longitudinal ridges on the upper leaf surface, and flowers that are densely covered with silky brown hairs on the outside. Grevillea pauciflora is also similar, but has a shorter style.

Taxonomy
Grevillea sparsiflora was first formally described by the botanist Ferdinand von Mueller in 1868 in his book Fragmenta Phytographiae Australiae from specimens collected by George Maxwell at Cape Arid.

Distribution and habitat
Sparse flowered grevillea is found between Mount Ragged, to the east of Esperance and Twilight Cove in the Coolgardie, Hampton and Mallee bioregions of southern Western Australia. It grows on sand dunes, limestone cliffs and in eucalypt woodland in sandy and loamy soils.

See also
 List of Grevillea species

References

sparsiflora
Endemic flora of Western Australia
Eudicots of Western Australia
Proteales of Australia
Taxa named by Ferdinand von Mueller
Plants described in 1868